Jean Greeff (born 17 April 1990) is a South African weightlifter. He competed in the Men's 94 kg event at the 2012 Summer Olympics.

References

External links
 

1990 births
Living people
South African male weightlifters
Olympic weightlifters of South Africa
Weightlifters at the 2012 Summer Olympics
Sportspeople from Johannesburg